Howard Beach is a neighborhood in the southwestern portion of the New York City borough of Queens. It is bordered to the north by the Belt Parkway and Conduit Avenue in Ozone Park, to the south by Jamaica Bay in Broad Channel, to the east by 102nd–104th Streets in South Ozone Park, and to the west by 75th Street in East New York, Brooklyn. The area consists mostly of low-rise single-family houses.

Howard Beach is located in Queens Community District 10 and its ZIP Code is 11414. It is patrolled by the New York City Police Department's 106th Precinct. Politically, Howard Beach is represented by the New York City Council's 32nd District.

History

Early development
Howard Beach was established in 1897 by William J. Howard, a Brooklyn glove manufacturer who operated a  goat farm on meadow land near Aqueduct Racetrack as a source of skin for kid gloves. In 1897, he bought more land and filled it in and the following year, built 18 cottages and opened a hotel near the water, which he operated until it was destroyed by fire in October 1907. He gradually bought more land and formed the Howard Estates Development Company in 1909. He dredged and filled the land until he was able to accumulate  by 1914. He laid out several streets, water mains and gas mains, and built 35 houses that were priced in the $2,500–$5,000 range.

The Long Island Rail Road established a station named Ramblersville in 1905 and a Post Office by the same name opened soon thereafter. A casino, beach, and fishing pier were added in 1915 and the name of the neighborhood was changed to Howard Beach on April 6, 1916. Development continued and ownership was expanded to a group of investors who sold lots for about $690 each starting in 1922. Development, however, was limited to the areas east of Cross Bay Boulevard near the LIRR station now known as Bernard Coleman Memorial Square (then Lilly Place). The rest of Howard Beach consisted of empty marsh land except for the area to the south of Coleman Square, centered around Russell St. and 102nd Street, which consisted of many small fishing bungalows that dotted alongside Hawtree Creek and Jamaica Bay. This area of Howard Beach would retain the name "Ramblersville."  Despite its close proximity to the Howard Beach station at Coleman Square, the LIRR would establish a station a quarter of a mile south down the line at Hamilton Beach in 1919.

After World War II, Queens and Long Island went through a major suburban building boom leading to the marsh land west of Cross Bay Boulevard to be filled in. This area was developed as "Rockwood Park" to the north and "Spring Park" to the south, together comprising what would be known as "New Howard Beach", while the area east of the boulevard became known as "Old Howard Beach." In the early 1950s farm land north of Rockwood Park was developed with the building of many red-bricked two-story garden style cooperative apartments along with some six-story co-op and condo apartment buildings. A number of private two-family houses were also built in this neighborhood, which was named Lindenwood. The various neighborhoods continued to be developed through the 1960s and 1970s as Cross Bay Boulevard became the area's main shopping district. During the 1990s and 2000s, there was further high-scale development as many of the area's old houses were torn down and replaced with upscale million-dollar mini-mansions.

Post-1980s

Hate crimes
In 1986 and 2005, two highly publicized hate crimes took place in Howard Beach.

On December 20, 1986, one African-American man was killed and another was beaten in Howard Beach. The incident heightened racial tensions in New York City. The dead man was 23-year-old Michael Griffith, a Trinidadian native living in Bedford-Stuyvesant, Brooklyn. He was killed December 20, 1986 when he was hit by a car after having been chased onto a highway by a mob of white youths who had beaten him and his friends for being in their neighborhood.

On June 29, 2005, local white men in Howard Beach attacked three African-American men with baseball bats. One victim was injured seriously enough to be hospitalized, and the police arrested two of the perpetrators in the case. Nicholas Minucci claimed that the victims had attempted to rob him. On June 10, 2006, Minucci, 20, who had uttered a racial epithet during the baseball bat attack, was found guilty of robbery and the racially motivated assault of Glenn Moore. On July 17, 2006, Minucci was sentenced to 15 years in prison.

Hurricane Sandy
As Hurricane Sandy approached New York on October 28, 2012, city officials ordered the evacuation of residents of Zone A (low-lying, susceptible to storm surge) neighborhoods, which included Howard Beach's Hamilton Beach area. Most of the rest of Howard Beach lay in Zone B, whose residents were urged to voluntarily evacuate. Many residents decided to stay and ride out the storm, citing the relatively minor damage caused by the previous year's Hurricane Irene.

Sandy made landfall on October 29, dragging inland a ten-foot-high storm surge from Jamaica Bay that flooded all of Old and New Howard Beach, plus the neighborhoods of Broad Channel and the Rockaways, along with some sections of Lindenwood and neighboring Ozone Park. The storm knocked out power to Howard Beach for three weeks. The flooding damaged most houses in the neighborhood, all of the stores along Cross Bay Boulevard, the Howard Beach–JFK Airport subway station, and the IND Rockaway Line trestle that carries trains over Jamaica Bay into Broad Channel and the Rockaways.

After Sandy, the Federal Emergency Management Agency and the New York City Office of Emergency Management provisionally re-classified Howard Beach, along with the Brooklyn neighborhoods of Gerritsen Beach and Red Hook, as Zone A neighborhoods. On April 5, 2013, the Howard Beach post office reopened after extensive repairs.

Geography

Like many New York City neighborhoods, Howard Beach is composed of several smaller neighborhoods – Howard Beach, Old Howard Beach, Hamilton Beach, Ramblersville, Spring Park, Rockwood Park, Lindenwood, and Howard Park (Old Howard Beach, Ramblersville, Howard Park, and Hamilton Beach are sometimes all grouped together as "Old Howard Beach", instead of being referred to by their proper names). Howard Beach proper is a small peninsula bordered by the Belt Parkway and Conduit Avenue on the north, Jamaica Bay on the south, Hawtree Creek on the east, separating it from Hamilton Beach, and Shellbank Basin on the west, that separates it from Cross Bay Boulevard.

Cross Bay Boulevard is the main commercial strip of Howard Beach; to the north it turns into Woodhaven Boulevard after Ozone Park.  Throughout the 1970s and 80s, the Boulevard was made up almost exclusively of locally owned shops and restaurants.  Starting in the 1990s, chain stores and restaurants began moving in, and now many well-known franchises have sites on the boulevard. Entertainment venues on Cross Bay Boulevard, such as the Kiddie-Park and Cross-Bay Lanes, were popular until their collapse in the 1970s and 1980s. The Joseph P. Addabbo Memorial Bridge (named for a deceased member of the United States House of Representatives who once represented the district that includes Howard Beach) carries the boulevard over Jamaica Bay, connecting mainland Queens to Broad Channel.

Bernard Coleman Memorial Square (colloquially known as Coleman Square) is a small plaza near the Howard Beach – JFK Airport station.  A memorial was erected here to servicemen from Howard Beach who died in World War I, World War II, the Korean War, and the Vietnam War.

Hamilton Beach
Hamilton Beach is a middle class neighborhood in the New York City borough of Queens. Its boundaries are the 102nd Street Creek to the north, the IND Rockaway Line tracks and JFK Airport to the east, Hawtree Creek to the west, and Jamaica Bay to the south. Hamilton Beach is one of the few communities in New York City that has its own volunteer fire department. Hamilton Beach is frequently referred to as West Hamilton Beach. East Hamilton Beach was on the east side of the Long Island Rail Road tracks, but the area was taken by the city for expansion of Idlewild Airport (now JFK Airport) in the 1940s. Hamilton Beach bears no relation to the Hamilton Beach Company other than the name. The company is named after a Mr. Hamilton and a Mr. Beach.

Until the mid-1950s there was a Hamilton Beach station on the Long Island Rail Road's Rockaway Beach Branch. The station closed on June 27, 1955, in connection with the LIRR's sale of much of the branch's right of way to the New York City Transit Authority. Hamilton Beach is a small community that has one long strip (104th Street) with ten dead-end blocks connected to it. It is surrounded mostly by water. There is one way into Hamilton Beach by car and two ways in by foot. It is accessible by a boardwalk that stretches from the A train station at Coleman Square to 104th Street, or by the Hawtree Basin pedestrian bridge, which is between two of the ten blocks. This bridge connects Hamilton and Old Howard Beach. Hamilton has a small park at the southern end, which includes a 200-foot baseball field, a handball court, a small jungle gym area and beach. Gateways Hamilton Beach Park, just south of 165th Avenue, is the last stop for the Q11 bus. When unincorporated, Hamilton Beach was once an area with dirt roads, cottage or shack-type houses (bungalows), and no sewer system. Since the early 21st century, Hamilton Beach has been "building up", and new houses are under construction on almost every block.

Lindenwood
Lindenwood is a section of Howard Beach, developed in the 1950s and 1960s on landfill property. Lindenwood is considered to be part of New Howard Beach (the newer side, as opposed to Old Howard Beach). It is primarily made up of six-story, orange- or red-brick apartment buildings, constructed in the early to mid-1960s; smaller co-op "garden-apartments" (four-unit red-brick buildings) constructed in the 1950s, which can be seen from the Belt Parkway; and two-family homes (some attached) built in the 1960s. The "hi-rise" apartment buildings are co-op (red bricks) or condominiums (orange brick). Heritage House East and West (84-39 and 84-29 153rd Avenue) were among the first condominium apartment buildings in New York State. Additional townhouses near the Brooklyn border were built in the 1970s, 1990s, and 2000s. The highrises used to be considered very family friendly. But since then, many of the apartment building playgrounds have been converted into sitting areas and no longer allow even dogs. Lindenwood's residents tend to be of mostly ethnic Jewish and Italians, along with some ethnic Hispanics.

In the middle of the neighborhood is P.S. 232, an elementary school built in the early 1960s (and now known as the Walter Ward School, named after the neighborhood's late longtime City councilman) and the Lindenwood Shopping Center, which consists of a supermarket and about 20 stores. In the early 1970s, a second supermarket called the Village was located behind the shopping center. After failing, the building became a mall, flea market, bingo hall and private school before finally becoming a walk-in medical center. There is also a second small strip mall on Linden Boulevard, adjacent to the Lindenwood Diner.

When the Jewish population was more numerous, they had a synagogue named Temple Judea in Lindenwood, located on 153rd Ave and 80th Street. The building was converted into apartments when the temple merged with what was then the Howard Beach Jewish Center in Rockwood Park. The neighborhood used to have two pool clubs, one on 88th Street and 151st Ave. These buildings were converted to walk-up apartments in the early 1970s. Another, across from 232, was redeveloped in 1980 into townhouses, adjacent to a branch of Queens County Savings Bank (formerly Columbia Savings Bank). There used to be a tennis bubble on 153rd Ave and 79th Street, that had been developed around 1980.

Old Howard Beach
Old Howard Beach is a section of Howard Beach that lies between Shellbank Basin and Hawtree Creek to the east of Cross Bay Boulevard. Coleman Square, Wetzel Triangle and Frank M. Charles Park are located in Old Howard Beach. The area is locally referred to as "Old Howard Beach" since it was the original place in which founder William Howard built his famous hotel, and later the area's first houses in the 1920s. The current housing in Old Howard Beach consists of several different types of houses. Those located near the former Howard Beach General Hospital (built in 1962) are mainly 1950s and 1960s detached two-family homes, while the areas near Coleman Square, Frank M. Charles Park, and Shellbank Basin contain primarily single-family homes. The Q11 bus serves the neighborhood.

Ramblersville

Ramblersville is a section of greater Howard Beach, being a small neighborhood of about a dozen blocks between Hawtree Creek and JFK Airport. It is nearly surrounded by waterways leading into nearby Jamaica Bay. It is bordered by on the north by 160th Avenue, on the west by  Hawtree Creek, across which is Old Howard Beach; on the east by the New York City Subway's Rockaway Line (beyond which is Bergen Basin and the airport; and on the south by the 102nd Street Creek. Crossing the creek, 102nd Street reaches Hamilton Beach at Russell Street.

Ramblersville, which once considered itself independent of New York City when the city was first unified, is purportedly the oldest neighborhood in what later became known as Howard Beach.
 
A 1905 article from The Washington Post said that all the houses were built on stilts and the population was one-thousand in the summer and a dozen in the winter. In 1962, the neighborhood's private water mains were replaced by the city; the neighborhood had 130 families at the time.

In 2001, The New York Times reported that the neighborhood "resembles a cozy fishing village with its pebbled streets and wooden bungalows built on pilings... [T]all grass... surrounds many of its marshy fields."

Fishing was a large industry in the tiny neighborhood. Ramblersville still has streets named Broadway, Church, and Bridge. Just north of Ramblersville is 159th Drive, also known as Remsen Place, named after Jeromus Remsen, a Revolutionary War officer. This area, near the current subway station, was known as "Remsen's Landing" at the time. Before the Howard Beach development was named in 1916, the entire area was commonly known as "Ramblersville", including Hamilton Beach to the south on Jamaica Bay, and Old Howard Beach to the west. The Howard Beach – JFK Airport subway stop was originally the "Ramblersville Station" on the Long Island Rail Road.

Ramblersville is the smallest neighborhood in New York City in terms of real estate per square foot.

Rockwood Park
Rockwood Park is a section of Howard Beach that mainly consists of single family homes and is considered to be a more upper class section of Howard Beach. It is part of what is commonly referred to as "New Howard" by many residents. The area is situated between 78th and 92nd Streets (these are north–south streets) and 156th and 165th Avenues (the east–west streets). The Q41 and Q21 serve Rockwood Park. To the west of 78th Street, the last street in the neighborhood, lies Spring Creek Park in which lies the border between Brooklyn and Queens.

The area remained primarily undeveloped during the first half of the 1900s. After the Second World War marsh land west of Cross Bay Boulevard was filled in, which led to the building of many Cape Cod-style houses in the area, followed later on in the 1960s and 1970s by high ranch-style houses. Becoming known as a more upscale section of Howard Beach led the area to become the home of many known mob figures, most notably Gambino crime family boss John Gotti who lived on 85th Street. Starting in the late 1980s and through the 2000s, Rockwood Park began to go through another building boom. Many of the area's old Cape Cod-style houses were demolished and replaced with upscale million dollar mini-mansions. Another famous resident was folk singer Woody Guthrie, who lived at 159-13 85th Street with his family after moving from Coney Island.

Demographics
Based on data from the 2010 United States census, the population of Howard Beach was 26,148, a change of -1,973 (-7.5%) from the 28,121 counted in 2000. The racial makeup of the neighborhood was 76.8% (20,069) White, 1.6% (413) African American, 0.1% (28) Native American, 3.5% (923) Asian, 0% (5) Pacific Islander, 0.2% (62) from other races, and 1% (249) from two or more races. Hispanic or Latino of any race were 16.8% (4,399) of the population. , half of the population is Italian or of Italian descent.

The entirety of Community Board 10, which comprises Howard Beach, southern Ozone Park, and South Ozone Park, had 125,603 inhabitants as of NYC Health's 2018 Community Health Profile, with an average life expectancy of 81.7 years. This is higher than the median life expectancy of 81.2 for all New York City neighborhoods. Most inhabitants are youth and middle-aged adults: 22% are between the ages of 0 and 17, 28% between 25 and 44, and 28% between 45 and 64. The ratio of college-aged and elderly residents was lower, at 9% and 13% respectively.

As of 2017, the median household income in Community Board 10 was $73,891. In 2018, an estimated 19% of Howard Beach and South Ozone Park residents lived in poverty, compared to 19% in all of Queens and 20% in all of New York City. One in ten residents (10%) were unemployed, compared to 8% in Queens and 9% in New York City. Rent burden, or the percentage of residents who have difficulty paying their rent, is 56% in Howard Beach and South Ozone Park, higher than the boroughwide and citywide rates of 53% and 51% respectively. Based on this calculation, Howard Beach and South Ozone Park are considered to be high-income relative to the rest of the city and not gentrifying.

Politics
Howard Beach is part of the 15th State Senate district, represented by Joseph Addabbo Jr., and the 23rd State Assembly district, represented by Stacey Pheffer Amato. It is part of District 32 in the New York City Council, represented by Joann Ariola.

Following redistricting in 2012, the neighborhood is split between the 5th and 8th congressional districts. The 5th District covers the parts of Howard Beach east of 104th Street and the 8th District covers the rest of the neighborhood west of 104th Street. These districts are represented by Gregory Meeks and Hakeem Jeffries respectively, .

Police and crime
Howard Beach, southern Ozone Park, and South Ozone Park are patrolled by the 106th Precinct of the NYPD, located at 103-53 101st Street. The 106th Precinct ranked 26th safest out of 69 patrol areas for per-capita crime in 2010. The rate of car thefts is high because of the area's proximity to the Belt Parkway, a major travel corridor. , with a non-fatal assault rate of 32 per 100,000 people, Howard Beach and South Ozone Park's rate of violent crimes per capita is less than that of the city as a whole. The incarceration rate of 381 per 100,000 people is lower than that of the city as a whole.

The 106th Precinct has a lower crime rate than in the 1990s, with crimes across all categories having decreased by 81.3% between 1990 and 2018. In 2018, there were 6 murders, 16 rapes, 183 robberies, 246 felony assaults, 133 burglaries, 502 grand larcenies, and 97 grand larcenies auto recorded in the precinct.

Fire safety 
Howard Beach contains a New York City Fire Department (FDNY) fire station, Engine Co. 331/Ladder Co. 173, at 158-99 Cross Bay Boulevard.

Hamilton Beach is served by the West Hamilton Beach Volunteer Fire Department, which has Engine 2 (Brush Unit), Engine 4, Engine 6, Ambulance 947 & 947-1, and two Chiefs vehicles, as well as a water pump.

Health
, preterm births are more common in Howard Beach and South Ozone Park than in other places citywide, though births to teenage mothers are less common. In Howard Beach and South Ozone Park, there were 97 preterm births per 1,000 live births (compared to 87 per 1,000 citywide), and 14.2 births to teenage mothers per 1,000 live births (compared to 19.3 per 1,000 citywide). Howard Beach and South Ozone Park have a low population of residents who are uninsured. In 2018, this population of uninsured residents was estimated to be 8%, lower than the citywide rate of 12%.

Twelve percent of Howard Beach and South Ozone Park residents are smokers, which is lower than the city average of 14% of residents being smokers. In Howard Beach and South Ozone Park, 27% of residents are obese, 19% are diabetic, and 34% have high blood pressure—compared to the citywide averages of 22%, 8%, and 23% respectively. In addition, 21% of children are obese, compared to the citywide average of 20%.

Eighty-three percent of residents eat some fruits and vegetables every day, which is less than the city's average of 87%. In 2018, 77% of residents described their health as "good", "very good", or "excellent", about equal to the city's average of 78%. For every supermarket in Howard Beach and South Ozone Park, there are eight bodegas.

The nearest major hospitals are Brookdale University Hospital and Medical Center in Brooklyn and Jamaica Hospital in Jamaica.

Post offices and ZIP Code
Howard Beach is covered by the ZIP Code 11414.  The United States Postal Service operates two post offices nearby: the Station A post office at 160-50 Cross Bay Boulevard and the Station B post office at 102-12 159th Avenue.

Education 

Howard Beach and South Ozone Park generally have a lower rate of college-educated residents than the rest of the city . While 28% of residents age 25 and older have a college education or higher, 23% have less than a high school education and 49% are high school graduates or have some college education. By contrast, 39% of Queens residents and 43% of city residents have a college education or higher. The percentage of Howard Beach and South Ozone Park students excelling in math rose from 33% in 2000 to 61% in 2011, and reading achievement rose from 37% to 48% during the same time period.

Howard Beach and South Ozone Park's rate of elementary school student absenteeism is less than the rest of New York City. In Howard Beach and South Ozone Park, 18% of elementary school students missed twenty or more days per school year, lower than the citywide average of 20%. Additionally, 82% of high school students in Howard Beach and South Ozone Park graduate on time, more than the citywide average of 75%.

Schools
 PS 146 The Howard Beach School
 PS 207 The Rockwood Park School
 PS 232 The Walter Ward School
 St. Helens Catholic School K–8 (Roman Catholic Diocese of Brooklyn)

Before the public elementary schools changed to K-8 schools, residents of Howard Beach that attended PS 207, PS 232 or PS 146 then went to Junior High School 202 (Robert H. Goddard Junior High School) for grades 7–8. It is located on the northwest corner of Conduit Boulevard and Lafayette Place, and a footbridge crosses over Conduit Boulevard, allowing students from southern Howard Beach to attend the school. Some 9th graders also attended JHS 202.

For grades 9–12, residents could attend their zoned school which is John Adams High School in nearby Ozone Park. Others attended specialty high schools such as Beach Channel High School in Rockaway Park, or Catholic high schools such as Christ the King, St. Francis Prep, Stella Maris or Archbishop Molloy.

In July 2020, Our Lady of Grace Catholic School made the announcement that it would no longer be operating, as the Diocese took over the property and decided to close the educational component due to financial strain as an indirect result of the COVID-19 pandemic.

Library
The Queens Public Library operates the Howard Beach branch at 92-06 156th Avenue.

Transportation 

The New York City Subway's Howard Beach–JFK Airport station, on the IND Rockaway Line was formerly a Long Island Rail Road station on the Rockaway Beach Branch. Frequent fires on the trestle to Broad Channel forced the LIRR to file Chapter 11 bankruptcy protection in the 1950s, which allowed New York City Transit to purchase the line in 1956. Prior to the AirTrain JFK's opening, the Port Authority provided a free shuttle bus to the terminals at JFK Airport.

All of these routes are operated by MTA Bus Company. There are also the  express buses.

Notable people
Notable current and former residents of Howard Beach include:

 Vito Antuofermo (born 1953), former boxer and actor
 Marco Battaglia (born 1973), former American football tight end in the National Football League.
 DJ Skribble (born 1968), DJ, producer, remixer, radio personality and TV actor.
 Vitas Gerulaitis (1954–1994), professional tennis player
 Keith Gottfried (born 1966), former General Counsel and Chief Legal Officer of the U.S. Department of Housing and Urban Development and senior member of the administration of President George W. Bush, spent much of his childhood as a resident of Howard Beach.
 John Gotti (1940–2002), Gambino crime family head was a resident of 85th Street in Howard Beach
 Victoria Gotti (born 1962), John's daughter, who starred in Growing Up Gotti
 Woody Guthrie (1912–1967), folk music legend (son Arlo Guthrie's music is frequently copyrighted to "Howard Beach Music, Inc.")
 Rick Hearst (born 1965), soap-opera actor
 James Maritato (born 1972), professional wrestler
 George Martin (born 1953), defensive end who played in the NFL for the New York Giants
 Joseph Massino (born 1943), Bonanno crime family boss and known as the "Last Godfather"
 Joey Ramone (1951–2001) and his brother Mickey Leigh (born 1954) lived in Howard Beach as children.
 Pia Toscano (born 1988), top 10 contestant on American Idol Season 10.
 Karina Vetrano (1986–2016), Howard Beach resident who was murdered in Spring Creek Park.

In popular culture
 A 1989 TV movie was made based on the 1986 racial incident entitled Howard Beach: Making a Case for Murder.
 In the 1989 Spike Lee movie Do the Right Thing, in a riot scene near the end of the film, a chant rises up: "Howard Beach! Howard Beach! Howard Beach!"  This immediately follows a scene wherein a young black man is killed by police using excessive force to break up a fight.
 On The Chris Rock Show, comedian Chris Rock proposed renaming Cross Bay Boulevard after Tupac Shakur, asking the predominantly white residents of the neighborhood to sign a petition.

See also 
 
 The Hole, New York

References

Populated places established in 1897
1897 establishments in New York City
 
Italian-American culture in New York City
Little Italys in the United States
Neighborhoods in Queens, New York
Populated coastal places in New York (state)